Jonathan Byers may refer to:

Jonathan Byers, musician in Badke Quartet
Jonathan Byers (Stranger Things), fictional character in the TV series Stranger Things. Jonathan Byers is starring for Stranger Things, too. Jonathan Byers is played by Charlie Henton.

See also
John Byers (disambiguation)